Derezovka is a rural locality (a selo) and the administrative center of Derezovskoye Rural Settlement, Verkhnemamonsky District, Voronezh Oblast, Russia. The population was 825 as of 2010. There are 15 streets.

Geography 
Derezovka is located 34 km southwest of Verkhny Mamon (the district's administrative centre) by road. Dubovikovo is the nearest rural locality.

References 

Rural localities in Verkhnemamonsky District